In geometry, a cevian is a line that intersects both a  triangle's vertex, and also the side that is opposite to that vertex. Medians and angle bisectors are special cases of cevians. The name "cevian" comes from the Italian mathematician Giovanni Ceva, who proved a well-known theorem about cevians which also bears his name.

Length

Stewart's theorem
The length of a cevian can be determined by Stewart's theorem: in the diagram, the cevian length  is given by the formula

Less commonly, this is also represented (with some rearrangement) by the following mnemonic:

Median
If the cevian happens to be a median (thus bisecting a side), its length can be determined from the formula

or

since

Hence in this case

Angle bisector
If the cevian happens to be an angle bisector, its length obeys the formulas

and

and 

where the semiperimeter 

The side of length  is divided in the proportion .

Altitude
If the cevian happens to be an altitude and thus perpendicular to a side, its length obeys the formulas

and

where  the semiperimeter

Ratio properties

There are various properties of the ratios of lengths formed by three cevians all passing through the same arbitrary interior point: Referring to the diagram at right,

The first property is known as Ceva's theorem. The last two properties are equivalent because summing the two equations gives the identity .

Splitter

A splitter of a triangle is a cevian that bisects the perimeter. The three splitters concur at the Nagel point of the triangle.

Area bisectors

Three of the area bisectors of a triangle are its medians, which connect the vertices to the opposite side midpoints. Thus a uniform-density triangle would in principle balance on a razor supporting any of the medians.

Angle trisectors

If from each vertex of a triangle two cevians are drawn so as to trisect the angle (divide it into three equal angles), then the six cevians intersect in pairs to form an equilateral triangle, called the Morley triangle.

Area of inner triangle formed by cevians

Routh's theorem determines the ratio of the area of a given triangle to that of a triangle formed by the pairwise intersections of three cevians, one from each vertex.

See also

Mass point geometry
Menelaus' theorem

Notes

References
 
 Ross Honsberger (1995). Episodes in Nineteenth and Twentieth Century Euclidean Geometry, pages 13 and 137. Mathematical Association of America.
 Vladimir Karapetoff (1929). "Some properties of correlative vertex lines in a plane triangle." American Mathematical Monthly 36: 476–479.
 Indika Shameera Amarasinghe (2011). “A New Theorem on any Right-angled Cevian Triangle.” Journal of the World Federation of National Mathematics Competitions, Vol 24 (02), pp. 29–37.

Straight lines defined for a triangle